Jennifer Corday (born July 12, 1966), is an American singer/songwriter known as Corday.

Early life
Corday was born and raised in Long Beach, California. She graduated with honors from Wilson High School, where she enjoyed sports, music and drama and was the school mascot. After graduating, Corday started college at Long Beach City College, where she performed as a cellist in the chamber orchestra, and participated as an actress in several productions. She transferred to Chapman University in Orange, California, where she continued studying theater and music. She toured Alaska and Hawaii, performing as a cellist in the chamber and symphony orchestras and electric bassist in the jazz ensemble. She became interested in directing her senior year where she had the opportunity to produce and direct one-act plays for the public. She graduated with a B.A. in Communications, with minors in Music and English.

Corday later returned to Chapman to study Education. She worked as a substitute teacher in the Orange Unified School District while she completed the program. After securing her Single Subject Clear Teaching Credential, Corday was hired to teach high school drama and English at Paramount High School, where she acted as Head of Department and the Cheerleading Advisor.

Career
Around this time, Corday began performing as a singer/songwriter/guitarist in the coffee house circuit. She formed a duo with Renea McKee, which led to the all-female band, Her Majesty. The group disbanded after releasing their first demo. Corday continued as a solo act, eventually forming another band, Corday and the Curious. She resigned from teaching, shortened the band name to Corday and founded Envy Records with Debbie Elmer, to produce and release her own records. Elmer and Corday parted ways and Corday now runs Envy Records on her own.

As of 2018, she has released six solo albums. Superhero was co-written, recorded, and produced in Corday's home studio. It is packaged in a  double disc Digipack with a CD and DVD music video of the title track, and includes behind-the-scenes footage. Artwork on the album is by Jamie Kivisto. The Los Angeles Times described her first album Naked as lacking in musicianship, but said that Corday was a "wonderful storyteller". Her album Driven was described by Lesbian News as having a "scrumptious, textured variety of sounds" and compared her with Sheryl Crow.

Corday's earlier albums, Driven and Welcome to My Past, sold thousands of copies. Her song "Pie" was included on the MTV Undressed soundtrack and in numerous independent films. Corday wrote the soundtrack to Elena Undone.

Corday founded Venus Envy, an organization that donates profits from compilation CDs towards the fight against breast cancer, in memory of her mother Judy. The band Cordray also performs at schools, presenting anti-drug and anti-tobacco concerts. In addition, she has toured overseas to perform for the troops.

She is openly gay with a large following in the community. In 1997, she was featured on the cover of Curve. Corday also blogs for SheWired.

Discography

Albums
 Naked (1997) - Corday and the Curious
 Welcome to My Past (2000)
 Driven (2001)
 Kick Ash (2003)
 Superhero (2007)
 Weekend Warrior (2012)
 Tastiest Licks: Greatest Hits (2015)
 You Can't Change My DNA (2018)

Singles and EPs
 "Spiderwebs" (1998) - Corday and the Curious
 "Redneck Lesbo" (2006)
 "Riding A Rainbow" (2014)
 "Lock On My Heart" (2017)
 "Heartbeat" (2017)

Soundtracks
 Laughing Matters... More! (2006)
 Poppy's Foursome (2007)
 Elena Undone (2010)

Band members
 Benj Clarke - bass
 Damien Smith - lead guitar
 Don E. Sachs - lead guitar
 Jorgen Ingmar - drums/percussion
 Krysta Carson - backing vocals

Previous members
 Brett Shuemaker - drums/backing vocals
 Joey Ancona - bass
 Rick Weller - lead guitar
 Kyle Zeiler - drums/backing vocals
 Robby Trujillo - bass/backing vocals
 Timothy John Ramirez - lead guitar

Awards
 Winner: Best Live Band, Best Alternative Band, Best Female Performer at Orange County Music Awards
 Winner: KIIS FM Battle of the Bands
 Winner: Best Female Acoustic Act at Orange County Music Awards
 Nominated: Best Pop Rock Band - Southern California Music Awards
 Nominated: Best Pop Rock Band - 2004 Orange County Music Awards
 Nominated: Best Song - DIY Awards, Los Angeles, for "I Rule The World"
 Nominated: 2004 PRISM Awards, for "Inhale"
 Nominated: Best Orange County Act and Best Video - LA Music Awards
 Nominated: Video Of The Year - GLAMA Awards, for "Pie"

References

External links
Corday's official web site
Corday interviews bands for Girl Rock: Episode 1

Living people
American women singer-songwriters
American lesbian musicians
American LGBT singers
American LGBT songwriters
Musicians from Long Beach, California
1966 births
Lesbian singers
Lesbian songwriters
Singer-songwriters from California
20th-century American LGBT people
21st-century American LGBT people
21st-century American women writers
American lesbian writers